Degrassi: The Next Generation is a Canadian teen drama television series created by Linda Schuyler and Yan Moore. The series first premiered on CTV on October 14, 2001, and concluded on MTV Canada on August 2, 2015. It is the fourth series set in the fictional Degrassi universe created by Schuyler and Kit Hood in 1979. Like its predecessors, Degrassi: The Next Generation follows a group of students from Degrassi Community School, a fictional school in Toronto, Ontario, and depicts some of the typical and atypical issues and challenges common to teenagers' lives.

The series produced 366 individual episodes; however, because of differing individual episode lengths, and all syndicated episodes being half-an-hour long, 385 produced episodes have aired.

The first twelve seasons of Degrassi: The Next Generation are available on DVD in Region 1, with season one through four also available in Region 4. Episodes are also available digitally: MTV Canada and TeenNick stream episodes on their websites; registered users of the Canadian and US iTunes Stores are able to purchase and download episodes for playback on home computers and certain iPods; episodes are also available for download from Puretracks in Canada. All episodes are available to stream on YouTube in countries outside the U.S. and Canada. The episodes are in a Windows Media 10 file and the purchaser owns them forever, although the episodes can only be burned onto a disc three times and copied to a device three times. Additionally, every episode is available on the Xbox Live Marketplace in the US.

In addition to the regular episodes, nine "special episodes" have been produced, which are not part of the Degrassi continuity. They consist of two Halloween-themed episodes and six documentaries following the work of the show's cast in other countries.

A number of episodes have aired out of production order in either Canada or the US. This is a list of Degrassi: The Next Generation episodes by order of production, as they appear on the DVDs. There are also several shorter episodes available on the official Degrassi YouTube channel, known as "Degrassi Minis".

Series overview

Episodes

Season 1 (2001–2002)

Season 2 (2002–2003)

Season 3 (2003–2004)

Season 4 (2004–2005)

Season 5 (2005–2006)

Season 6 (2006–2007)

Season 7 (2007–2008)

Season 8 (2008–2009)

Season 9 (2009–2010)

Season 10 (2010–2011)

Season 11 (2011–2012)

Season 12 (2012–2013)

Season 13 (2013–2014)

Season 14 (2014–2015)

Specials
In addition to the 385 regular episodes, nine "special episodes" have been produced, which are not considered to be part of the Degrassi continuity.

"Degrassi in Kenya" ("Degrassi: Doing What Matters" in the US) aired October 18, 2007 on MTV Canada and March 14, 2008 on The N. It documented the Degrassi: The Next Generation cast visiting the Masai Mara in Kenya to build an extension onto Motony Primary School. "Degrassi of the Dead", parodying the zombie movie Dawn of the Dead, was a Halloween special episode which aired on the N on October 26, 2007, and four days later on CTV. The episode was not part of the Degrassi continuity, although the first fifteen minutes did feature a number of actors in character, some of whom had turned into zombies after eating genetically modified food in the school cafeteria, while others were trying to escape. The second half of the episode was a behind-the-scenes look with actors Cassie Steele, Aubrey Graham and Lauren Collins. It was directed by Stefan Brogren, and originally made as five online-only Degrassi Minis, with an additional streaming video of Aubrey Graham dancing to a Halloween-themed rap performed by Brogren. The third was a second Halloween special called "Curse of Degrassi", which aired on the N on October 24 and on CTV on October 26, 2008. In this special, Rick Murray's ghost possesses Holly J. and begins tormenting the students who laughed at him on the day of the "Whack-Your-Brain" incident which eventually led to his death. A third horror-themed special aired as part of season 11; however, "Nowhere to Run" is part of the continuity.

"Degrassi in Ecuador" aired in December 2008, in both Canada and the US; it documented the cast visiting Ecuador. "Degrassi in India" aired a number of times on MuchMusic during the 2010 holiday break, but was promoted as premiering on December 29, 2010; it documented the cast visiting India. Also airing during the holiday break was "Degrassi in Haiti", produced and aired in 2011. A number of other specials have also aired, documenting a MuchMusic VJ visiting the set of Degrassi, at Epitome Studios.

References

External links
 List of Degrassi: The Next Generation episodes at TeenNick
 List of Degrassi: The Next Generation episodes at IMDB.

 
Degrassi: The Next Generation